The Sucker Punch is a 1954 thriller novel by the British writer James Hadley Chase, writing under the pen name Raymond Marshall. An ambitious young man marries a wealthy woman he has no desire for, then plots to kill her for her money.

Adaptation
In 1957 it was made into a French film A Kiss for a Killer directed by Henri Verneuil and starring Henri Vidal, Mylène Demongeot and Isa Miranda. The 1997 Indian thriller Aar Ya Paar also drew inspiration from the novel.

References

Bibliography
 Goble, Alan. The Complete Index to Literary Sources in Film. Walter de Gruyter, 1999.

1954 British novels
Novels by James Hadley Chase
British thriller novels
British novels adapted into films
Jarrold Publishing books